is a city in Niigata Prefecture, Japan. , the city had an estimated population of 96,236 in 37,017 households, and a population density of 179 persons per km².

Geography
Shibata is located in a mostly inland region of north-central Niigata Prefecture on the northern end of the Echigo Plain, with a small shoreline of the Sea of Japan.

Surrounding municipalities
Niigata Prefecture
Kita-ku, Niigata
Agano
Tainai
Aga
Seiro
Fukushima Prefecture
Kitakata
Yamagata Prefecture
Oguni

Climate
Shibata has a Humid climate (Köppen Cfa) characterized by warm, wet summers and cold winters with heavy snowfall.  The average annual temperature in Shibata is 13.0 °C. The average annual rainfall is 1920 mm with September as the wettest month. The temperatures are highest on average in August, at around 26.2 °C, and lowest in January, at around 1.2 °C.

Demographics
Per Japanese census data, the population of Shibata peaked around the year 2000 and has been in decline since then.

History
The area of present-day Shibata was part of ancient Echigo Province. The area developed as a castle town for Shibata Domain under the Tokugawa shogunate during the Edo period. After the Meiji restoration, the area was organized into Kitakanbara District, Niigata. The town of Shibata was established on April 1, 1889 with the creation of the modern municipalities system. It was elevated to city status on January 1, 1947. On July 7, 2003 the town of Toyoura (from Kitakanbara District) was merged into Shibata. Likewise, on  May 1, 2005  the town of Shiunji, and the village of Kajikawa (both from Kitakanbara District) were merged into Shibata.

Government
Shibata has a mayor-council form of government with a directly elected mayor and a unicameral city legislature of 27 members. Shibata, together with the town of Seirō, collectively contributes three members to the Niigata Prefectural Assembly. In terms of national politics, the city is part of Niigata 3rd district of the lower house of the Diet of Japan.

Economy
The economy of Shibata is dominated by the agricultural sector, with rice as the primary crop. Industries include sake brewing and plastics components production.

Education
Shibata has 19 public elementary schools and 10 public junior high schools operated by the city government. The city has seven public high schools operated by the Niigata Prefectural Board of Education, and the prefecture also operates one special education school for the handicapped. Keiwa College is also located in Shibata.

Transportation

Railway
 JR East - Uetsu Main Line
  -   -   -  - 
 JR East - Hakushin Line
  -  -

Highway

Sister city relations
 - Uijeongbu, Gyeonggi Province, South Korea   (friendship city)
 - St. James, Missouri, US
 - Orange City, Iowa, US

Local attractions

  is the main visitor attraction and provide the backdrop to the spring cherry blossom viewing parties. 
  Garden 
 .
  hot spring

References

External links

Official Website 

 
Cities in Niigata Prefecture